Gregory Scott is a Democratic member of the Pennsylvania House of Representatives, representing the 54th District since 2023.

A native of Norristown, Scott served as a non-voting junior borough councilman and a volunteer firefighter and EMT as a teenager. He went on to earn a bachelor's degree in business communications from Chestnut Hill College, and a master's degree in organizational leadership from the Philadelphia College of Osteopathic Medicine in 2013.

Scott worked as a congressional aide to U.S. Representatives Joe Sestak and Chaka Fattah, and as chief of staff to the CEO of Universal Companies, a nonprofit founded by Kenny Gamble.

Scott was elected a magisterial district judge in November 2015, becoming the first African American district judge in Montgomery County and (at 28) the youngest sitting judge in Pennsylvania. He resigned in February 2022 to run for the Pennsylvania House of Representatives in the 54th District, which was redistricted from Western Pennsylvania to Montgomery County. He was elected on November 8, 2022, defeating Republican Allen Arthur Anderson by 72% to 28%.

External links

References 

Living people
Democratic Party members of the Pennsylvania House of Representatives
21st-century American politicians
Year of birth missing (living people)